Kiss Tomorrow Goodbye may refer to:

"Kiss Tomorrow Goodbye" (song), by Luke Bryan
Kiss Tomorrow Goodbye, a 1948 novel by Horace McCoy
Kiss Tomorrow Goodbye (film), a 1950 film starring James Cagney based on the novel
Kiss Tomorrow Goodbye (TV film), a 1980 TV movie starring Jason Priestley and Kari Wuhrer